Shah Jahangir Kabir (1935-9 June 2013) is a Awami League politician and the former Member of Parliament of Rangpur-21.

Career
Kabir was elected to parliament from Rangpur-21 as an Awami League candidate in 1973.

Death
Kabir died on 9 June 2013 at Rangpur Medical College.

References

Awami League politicians
1935 births
2013 deaths
1st Jatiya Sangsad members